Alexander Thomas Jeremejeff (born 12 October 1993) is a Swedish professional footballer who plays as a forward for Super League Greece club Levadiakos, on loan from Panathinaikos. He has previously played for Örgryte IS, Qviding FIF, Malmö FF and BK Häcken. He won one cap for the Sweden national team in 2019.

Club career

Örgryte IS
Born in Kungsbacka, Jeremejeff started to play for local side Tölö IF before joining Gothenburg-club Örgryte IS in 2005. After advancing through the academy and scoring five goals in a youth game against Malmö FF, Jeremejeff was picked for the senior squad to a league game against Kristianstads FF in September 2011. He made his debut the same game, substituting with Danny Ervik in the 75' minute while losing 2–3, but manage to impact the team to later win by 4–3.

Örgryte offered Jeremejeff a senior contract after the 2011 season, which he accepted. He scored his first goal in an exhibition game against Qviding on March 28 the following year, scoring the minute after he was substituted in. However, he came to play only two league games during the 2012 season when Örgryte won Division 1, and decided to leave the club in January 2013 due to lack of playtime.

Qviding FIF
Jeremejeff signed a long-term contract with Division 1 team Qviding on January 28, 2013, as a free agent. The 2013 season was his first as a starting player, scoring 14 goals in 21 league games - almost half of the team's total of 33 goals, ending up being the second top scorer in division. His record made him attractive to professional clubs and on 26 October 2013 he was signed by the Allsvenskan club BK Häcken. Jeremejeff have afterwards expressed gratitude to Qviding manager Bosko Orovic, claiming he was the football coach that meant most for his football career.

BK Häcken
with Jeremejeff having joined BK Häcken in October 2013, Jeremejeff made his debut for BK Häcken in a 3–1 defeat at IF Elfsborg on 4 April 2014.

Malmö FF
In July 2016, Jeremejeff signed for Malmö FF on a two-and-a-half year contract.

Return to BK Häcken
In the summer of 2018, Jeremejeff rejoined former club BK Häcken for an undisclosed fee, rumoured to be 5,000,000 SEK.

Dynamo Dresden
On 13 August 2019, Jeremejeff signed for German 2. Bundesliga Dynamo Dresden on a two-year contract for an undisclosed fee. On 18 August 2019, he scored on his Dresden debut; the winning goal in a 2–1 victory at home to 1. FC Heidenheim. After a further 5 appearances and a goal, Jeremejeff tore his calf muscle in a 4–1 defeat to local rivals Erzgebirge Aue on 29 September 2019, ruling him out until late October.

International career
He made his debut for the Sweden national football team on 8 January 2019 in a friendly against Finland, as a starter.

Career statistics

Club

Honours
BK Häcken
 Allsvenskan: 2022
 Svenska Cupen: 2015–16, 2018–19

Malmö FF
Allsvenskan: 2016, 2017

Individual
 Allsvenskan Top goalscorer: 2022
 Allsvenskan Player of the Season: 2022
 Allsvenskan Forward of the Season: 2022

References

External links
  (archive)
 
 
 

1993 births
Living people
People from Kungsbacka
Association football forwards
Swedish footballers
Sweden international footballers
Swedish expatriate footballers
Allsvenskan players
Ettan Fotboll players
2. Bundesliga players
Örgryte IS players
Qviding FIF players
BK Häcken players
Malmö FF players
Dynamo Dresden players
Swedish expatriate sportspeople in Germany
Expatriate footballers in Germany
Swedish people of Russian descent
Sportspeople from Halland County